Championship Manager 2010 is an association football manager simulation video game developed by Beautiful Game Studios and published by Eidos Interactive. It was released for Microsoft Windows on September 11, 2009 making it the Second Championship Manager game to be released by Football Manager since Championship Manager 2007.

The Mac OS X version of the game was shipped from Virtual Programming on November 23, 2009.

Features
The football management game developed by Beautiful Game Studios offers several notable features to enhance the gameplay experience. One of these features is the set piece creator, which allows players to create set pieces and utilize their squad members' strengths to produce a successful free kick. The set piece creator adds a strategic layer to the game by breaking down the set piece into multiple stages.

Players can access a world map view of their knowledge of different countries and allocation of expenditures, while scouts provide updates on up-and-coming star players from around the world. This feature enables players to make informed decisions regarding scouting and recruitment.

Drills can be set up to test players' skills in various areas, such as shooting, crossing, and practice matches, allowing players to improve their team's performance in weak areas.

The game has a dynamically updated display window that shows league tables, fixtures, top goal scorers, and other essential information in real-time, providing players with a comprehensive overview of the game. Global coverage appearing throughout the game ensures that players stay up-to-date with the latest developments in football worldwide.

Pro-Zone is another feature that allows players to access post-match analysis on their players, including full stats on their own team and the opposition. This feature enables players to analyze their performance, identify areas of improvement, and strategize for future games.

Development
Originally named Championship Manager 2009, the game was renamed due to a change in release dates from April 2009 to September 11, 2009. Championship Manager 2010 is the first game in the series to have a 2-year development time. This is due to recent versions in the series not being critically successful for publisher Eidos Interactive, who admitted that the franchise had lost direction in recent years and that the publisher was determined to make the game a "strong alternative" to Sega's Football Manager. On 18 August 2009, Eidos Interactive announced fans would be able to buy the game for as little as 1p along with a £2.50 'transaction fee'. This is the first time any video games publisher has done this.

Reception

Championship Manager 2010 has received more positive reviews than previous versions of the Championship Manager series. Eurogamer gave the game an 8 out of 10 stating "For the first time, the Championship Manager series is a viable alternative to Football Manager... CM10's attempts to innovate must be applauded, and the majority of its refinements are either solid additions or real winners. MSN UK also applauded the game and concluded "Once you get stuck into a season, it is fearsome addictive, and all aspects of football management are present and correct, if not necessarily developed to Football Manager'''s level of sophistication. It is a lot more forgiving than Football Manager... If that doesn’t bother you, it’s worth considering for the first time in years."

Now Gamer gave the game a 7.3 out of 10 concluding "Championship Manager 2010 – particularly with its impressive highlights engine – manages to land a good few solid punches, and gives the Sports Interactive team something to genuinely mull over. For Championship Manager, it is now in the finest shape it’s been in for half a decade, and there are more solid foundations for next year’s edition to be built on." UK news site The Guardian gave the game 4 out 5 stars and concluded that "If you seek a straight-down-the-line football management experience that tests your powers of wheeler-dealing, man-management, tactics and training, then you will find Championship Manager thoroughly satisfying...At last, the beloved old stager has found a hint of its previous form."

Sales
The General Manager of Beautiful Game Studios, Roy Meredith, claimed the 'Pay What You Want' promotion for Championship Manager 2010 had "exceeded" expectations. In its first two weeks of release the game held the No.1 spot in the PC Retail charts. In its third week the game slipped to No. 2. After over four months of being sold, the game dropped out of the Top 10 Retail PC Games chart.

See alsoFootball Manager 2010''

External links
Official Championship Manager Site

References

2009 video games
Eidos Interactive games
Games for Windows certified games
MacOS games
Windows games
Association football management video games
J2ME games
Video games developed in the United Kingdom